The End is Mika Nakashima's fourth studio album (fifth full-length album and seventh overall release), and her only album released under the name "Nana starring Mika Nakashima". It marks the end of Nakashima's bond with the Nana franchise, and is also referred to as First and Last Album of Nakashima's role Nana Oosaki.

All of the songs on "The End" are rock-oriented songs.

Track listing

Charts and sales

Oricon sales charts (Japan)

References
 http://www.mikanakashima.com/
 http://www.nana2-movie.com/music/index.html

Mika Nakashima albums
2006 albums